The Bhutia ("inhabitants of Sikkim".) are a community of Sikkimese people living in the state of Sikkim in northeastern India, who speak Drenjongke or Sikkimese, a Tibetic language fairly mutually intelligible with standard Tibetan. In 2001, the Bhutia numbered around 60,300. Bhutia here refers to people of Tibetic ancestry. There are many clans within the Bhutia tribe and Inter-Clan marriages are preferred rather than marriages outside of the tribe.

Bhutia

The language spoken by the Bhutias in Sikkim is Sikkimese, which is 75% mutually intelligible with Tibetan and Dzongkha, the language of Bhutan. Most Bhutias practice the Nyingma school, followed by the Kagyu school of Tibetan Buddhism. The Bhutias are spread out over Sikkim, Bhutan, Uttarkhand, Himachal and  Nepal and districts of Kalimpong and Darjeeling in West Bengal.

History

From the 8th century, people migrated from Tibet to Sikkim in small numbers. But during the 13th century many clans came with Gyed Bum Sa, and thereafter there was a series of Lamas who visited southwards, because of the constant conflicts between Red hat and Yellow Hat in Tibet. With the final victory of the Yellow hats in the mid-1600s. There was a mass persecution of the followers of the Red hat sect by the victorious Güshi Khan and his Gelug allies. Many fearing the same fate as their Red hat brethren fled southwards towards Sikkim and Bhutan. In consequence, there are Red hat majorities in both Bhutan and Sikkim to this day. They migrated through the different passes ("La" in Tibetan means "hill") in the Himalayas. Geographical indications in the Bhutias' last names are common. In Northern Sikkim, for example, where the Bhutias are the majority inhabitants, they are known as the Lachenpas or Lachungpas, meaning inhabitants of Lachen ("big pass") or Lachung ("small pass") respectively.

Bhutia aristocrats were called Kazis after similar landlord titles in neighboring regions, especially in modern-day Bangladesh. This feudal system was an integral part of the Chogyal monarchy prior to 1975, when Sikkim was an independent monarchy; the ruling dynasty of the Kingdom of Sikkim before the mid-1970s plebiscite was the Bhutia Namgyal dynasty. Among the Bhutias, the Lachenpas and Lachungpas have their own traditional legal system called the "Dzumsa" which means the meeting place of the people. The Dzumsa is headed by the village headman known as the Pipon. People of North Sikkim have been given full protection by the state government by deeming a status of Panchayat ward and the Pipon, a status of Panchayat head.

Clothing
The traditional outfit of Bhutias is the bakhu (same like the Tibetan chuba), which is a loose cloak type garment fastened at the neck on one side and near the waist with a silk/cotton belt. Male members array the bakhu with loose trousers. Womenfolk wear the bakhu with a silken full sleeve blouse called a honju; a loose gown type garment fastened tight near the waist with a belt. In the front portion, a loose sheet of multicolored woolen cloth with exotic geometric designs is tied. This is called the pangden and is a symbol of a married woman. This traditional outfit is complemented by embroidered leather boots worn by both men and women.

Bhutia women enjoy a much higher status than their counterparts from other communities. Pure gold tends to be favored by both women and men thus traditional jewelry is mostly made of 24 carat (100%) gold.

Society
In Sikkim, the Bhutias are mostly employed in the government sector, in agriculture, and increasingly in the business arena as well. In the district of Darjeeling, Bhutias are often employed in government and commerce. Bhutias practise intermarriage within their clans and follow a very hierarchical system of bride and groom selection. Clan discrimination is widespread, and marriage outside the community is looked down upon.

Religion

The Bhutias are followers of Vajrayana Buddhism, mainly the Nyingma and Kagyu schools. The main festivals observed by them are Losar  . The first week of February is usually the time of Losar as it marks the start of the Tibetan New Year. Fire dances are common in the evenings during Losar. Losoong is usually celebrated as the end of the Tibetan year and falls at the end of the tenth Tibetan lunar month (usually December). It is the most important festival among the Bhutias in India, and is marked by the traditional Cham dancing and merry-making. Losoong is celebrated across the monasteries in Bhutan, Nepal and Sikkim. In Sikkim, during the festival of Losoong, often dance forms depict narrativized tales from the life of Padmasambhava or Guru Ugyen.

Monasteries of the Bhutias dot various places in India, most notably the Rumtek Monastery in Sikkim and the Bhutia Busty Monastery or Karma Dorjee Chyoling Monastery, which is also the oldest Monastery in Darjeeling.

Houses
A traditional Bhutia house is called a "khim" and is usually rectangular.

The Bhutias have a stone structure outside the house which is used for burning incense. It is called "sangbum." "Sang" means incense and "bum" means vase; the shape of the structure is like a vase. It is used for burning sang, a sacred offering to the deities. The deities are offered scented dried leaves/stalks of Rhododendron anthopogon, Juniperus recurva, Rhododendron setosum or incense sticks made of pine.

Cuisine

Bhutia people traditionally eat rice with animal-fat-fried vegetables or meat, usually pork or beef, and occasionally mutton or chicken. Other well-known foods are momo, steamed meat dumplings, and the thukpa, noodles in broth. The Losar and Loosong are two among many festivals celebrated by the Bhutia community. Almost all Bhutia festivals and holidays hold Buddhist religious significance. They are also known to utilize over 70 species of animal, fungi, and plant. Chhaang is the favourite drink of the Bhutias, and increasingly of other communities coexisting with the Bhutias. It is made of fermented barley or millet, and served in a bamboo container called the Tongba. Tea with milk and sugar, and butter tea, are also served on religious or social occasions.

Arts, crafts, and music 
The Bhutia have a rich tradition of dances, songs, and folktales. The popular Bhutia folk dances are Denzong-Neh-Na, Ta-Shi-Yang-Ku, Tashi Shabdo, Guru-Chinlap, Singhi Chham and Yak Chham.

Musical instruments used are flute, yangjey, drum, and yarka.

Status within India

Within the Dominion of India, the Bhutias as recognized as Scheduled Tribes in the states of Sikkim, West Bengal and Tripura.

On August 26, 2015, during her visit to Darjeeling, the Mamata Banerjee led West Bengal Government, announced the formation of a separate development board for the Bhutia community.

Notable Bhutias
Bhaichung Bhutia - former Indian football captain
Kazi Lhendup Dorjee - first chief minister of Sikkim from 1975 to 1979
Pem Dorji - former Indian football captain
Ganju Lama - recipient of the Victoria Cross
Norden Tenzing Bhutia - musician, composer and singer
Samten Bhutia - film director and writer
Danny Denzongpa - Bollywood actor
Karma Loday Bhutia - Sikkim politician
Ugyen Tshering Gyatso Bhutia - Sikkim politician
Tashi Thendup Bhutia - Sikkim politician
Dorjee Dazom Bhutia - Sikkim politician
Nadong Bhutia - Indian footballer
Kunzang Bhutia - Indian footballer
Namgyal Bhutia - Indian footballer
Sonam Bhutia - Indian footballer
Thupden Bhutia - Indian footballer
Lako Phuti Bhutia - Indian women's footballer
Tshering Bhutia - Sikkim first-class cricketer
Karma Bhutia - Sikkim first-class cricketer
Mandup Bhutia - Sikkim first-class cricketer
Rinzing Bhutia - Sikkim first-class cricketer

See also
 Vajrayana Buddhism
 Sikkimese language
 Indigenous peoples of Sikkim

References

Further reading
 

Scheduled Tribes of India
Ethnic groups in Nepal
Ethnic groups in Bhutan
Sino-Tibetan-speaking people
Himalayan peoples
Buddhist communities of Nepal
Buddhist communities of Bhutan
Buddhist communities of India
Tribes of West Bengal
Social groups of West Bengal
Ethnic groups in Northeast India
Ethnic groups in South Asia